Heterorhabditis heliothidis is a nematode species in the genus Heterorhabditis.

It is a parasite of insects such as the Colorado potato beetle or moths in the genus Crambus.

References

External links 

Rhabditida
Nematodes described in 1976
Parasitic nematodes of animals
Parasites of insects